Brusino may refer to:

Brusino Arsizio, municipality in the district of Lugano in the canton of Ticino in Switzerland
Brusino, Bulgaria, village in the municipality of Ivaylovgrad, in Haskovo Province, in southern Bulgaria
Brusino, frazione of Cavedine in Trentino in Italy